Ghorakal is the place situated in the Nainital district of the Uttarakhand state of India
Ghorakhal means pond for water to horses. It is the picturesque site at the height of more than 2,000 m.

It is situated near Bhowali and is the seat for Army school, known as Sainik School Ghorakhal, established in 1966 at the Ghorakhal Estate of the Nawab of Rampur. The famous Golu Devta temple is situated on a hill above overlooking the school.

Some scenes of Madhumati 1958 classic by Bimal Roy, which was shot extensively around Nainital had some scenes shot at Ghorakhal as well. And scene of the temple in Vivah 2006 movie had the scene from the famous Golu Devta Mandir

References

External links
 Golu Devta Temple at wikimapia

Cities and towns in Nainital district
Tourism in Uttarakhand
Hill stations in Uttarakhand
Nainital
Hindu temples in Uttarakhand

bg:Наинитал
bpy:নৈনিতাল
new:नैनी ताल
no:Nainital
simple:Nainital
sv:Nainital
vi:Nainital